Yogeshwar Amatya (born Yogeshwor Prasad Amatya, 3 April) is a Nepali singer, musician, producer, actor, social activist, and photographer. He has sold more than 1 million records, making him one of Nepal's best-selling music artists and the best-selling Nepali rock artist of all time.

Amatya came to fame in Nepal with his album Jaba Sandhya Hunchha and became more famous with his 1998 song Karai Kara Le. In 1998, he released his Ahile Chaahin Drabya Ko Aaasha Ma, Bastoo album which included Wakka Dikka. Amatya also participated in Melancholy song as a solo artist with 365 other Nepali singers and musician. The song set a Guinness World Record entitled "Most Vocal Solos in a Song Recording".

Education
Amatya has mentioned that he has never received any formal training in music. He says, "I never had any formal training regarding music... I guess I have to say that I don't have any musical background, except late night jamming with tons of beer with my buddies."

Biography
Amatya has not used his middle name since his father dropped it. His father, Bhuwaneshor Amatya, was the first President of Nepal Chalchitra Sangha. His mother, Lamu Amatya, was the first trained nurse in Nepal.

He was bullied by classmates while studying at St. Xavier's for his cleft lip. It got so out of hand that some of the seniors stole a guitar he had borrowed from his cousin. After that incident, he left the school and joined North Point, Darjeeling.

Amatya enjoys gems, especially regarding gem sets containing diamonds and emeralds. He has said if he had not been a musician, he would have been a jeweler. Amatya has a bachelor's degree in Gemology from the Gemological Institute of India, Bombay.

Amatya is a sportsman with expertise in some sports. He has played football for Army (Shreenath Gana) and NRT at center forward, and has scored hat-tricks for NRT. He was declared "Man of the Match" in the WAVE Kick Off Cup 2006, and was one of the few who played the whole 90 minutes. Amatya is also an expert in tae kwon do. He has a Dan degree black belt in the sport, and is considered an expert in its theoretical aspects. Amatya also won medals in the sport when he was in the United States.

Amatya gave his first performance at Mayur Chalchitra Mandir, Banepa, while drunk. After the good response and encouragement from senior artists and friends, he started to sing for fun. He released his first album after encouragement and pestering from Brajesh Khanal and Prabhat Rimal. He dedicated the album to them and named it, in their honor, Karai Kara le.

He is fond of hunting. He is a pacifist, but enjoys the thrill of the hunt. Amatya also enjoys interior designing. He took a course in interior design for 2 semesters from the School of Interior Designing in the USA.

Amatya also was a pub owner at Durbar Marg in Kathamndu which he closed because of large unpaid credits from customers.

Discography

Compilation albums
yogeshwor amatya jaba sandhya
Bhanchan Logne Manche Bhayar

References

External links

1964 births
Living people
21st-century Nepalese male singers
Nepalese male actors
Musicians from Kathmandu